Magnolia globosa, the globe magnolia or hen magnolia, is a species of Magnolia native to Bhutan, southwestern China (Sichuan, Xizang, Yunnan), northeastern India (Assam, Sikkim), northern Myanmar-Burma, and eastern Nepal.

Description
It is a deciduous large shrub or small tree growing to 7–10 m tall. The leaves are variable in shape, obovate, elliptic-ovate or broadly ovate, 10–24 cm long and 5–14 cm broad, glossy dark green above, paler and slightly downy below, and with a bluntly acute apex. The flowers are creamy white, 6-7.6 cm wide, with the 9-12 tepals all about the same size; they are fragrant, nodding or pendent, and have a rounded, globose profile.

Cultivation
It is closely related to M. wilsonii and M. sieboldii, and is rare though in cultivation. Flowers are less showy than other species in the genus, so use as a foliage plant would fit this species best.

References

External links
Hunt, D. (ed). (1998). Magnolias and their allies. International Dendrology Society and Magnolia Society. 
Flora of China: Magnoliaceae (draft account)
Photo of flowers and foliage

globosa
Flora of South-Central China
Flora of Tibet
Flora of the Indian subcontinent
Flora of Myanmar
Garden plants of Asia
Ornamental trees